Monument to Endre Ady is a monument in Zalău, Romania.

It was opened in front of Silvania National College, on November 22, 1957 (80 years after the birth of Endre Ady).

References

External links 
  Ady Endre, Balaskó Nándor, 1957

Outdoor sculptures in Romania
1957 in Romania
1957 sculptures
Monuments and memorials in Zalău
Buildings and structures completed in 1957
Bronze sculptures in Romania